Holger Henry Nielsen (2 October 1910 – 18 November 1969) was a Danish middle- and long-distance runner. Nielsen held the 3000 m world record from 1934 to 1936 and placed third in men's 10,000 metres at the 1934 European Championships.

Career

Early in his career Nielsen trained in Finland, which was the leading distance-running country at the time, and learned from Finnish runners. He won his first Danish championship title at 5000 m in 1930. Nielsen broke the 3000 m world record in Stockholm on 25 July 1934; he faced Poland's Janusz Kusociński, who held the previous record of 8:18.8, and defeated him. Nielsen's winning time was 8:18.3; as a world record, it was officially ratified as 8:18.4, since the IAAF's rules required times at the distance to be rounded up to the next fifth of a second. Later that year, Nielsen won bronze in the 10,000 m at the inaugural European Championships in Turin, losing only to Finland's Ilmari Salminen and Arvo Askola; he was Denmark's only medalist in the meet.

Nielsen competed in the 1936 Summer Olympics in the 5000 m, but failed to qualify from the heats. He was eventually excluded from amateur sports for breaking amateur rules by receiving monetary prizes. His world record was broken by Finland's Gunnar Höckert, who ran 8:14.8 in September 1936.

References

1910 births
1969 deaths
People from Nørresundby
Danish male middle-distance runners
Danish male long-distance runners
Olympic athletes of Denmark
Athletes (track and field) at the 1936 Summer Olympics
European Athletics Championships medalists
World record setters in athletics (track and field)
Sportspeople from the North Jutland Region
20th-century Danish people